James Scott (born 1882) was a Scottish footballer who played for Liverpool, Dumbarton, Third Lanark and New York Giants.

References

External links
 LFC History profile

1882 births
20th-century deaths
Year of death missing

Scottish footballers

Footballers from North Ayrshire
Liverpool F.C. players
Dumbarton F.C. players
Third Lanark A.C. players
Ardeer Thistle F.C. players
Scottish Football League players
English Football League players
Association football wing halves
New York Giants (soccer) players
Scottish Junior Football Association players
American Soccer League (1921–1933) players
Scottish expatriate sportspeople in the United States
Expatriate soccer players in the United States
Scottish expatriate footballers
People from Stevenston